Luke Pretorius is a South African Anglican bishop: he has been the
Bishop of St Mark the Evangelist, a diocese of the Anglican Church of Southern Africa (ACSA), since 2019.

Pretorious was educated at was educated at St Paul's Theological College and ordained in 1990. He served his title at Greytown, KwaZulu-Natal. After that he was REctor of St. Mary's Richmond, KwaZulu-Natal. He was then the incumbent at Letaba and Archdeacon of  Mopani. In May 2011 he became Dean of Christ Church Cathedral, Polokwane.

Notes 

Living people
Anglican bishops of St Mark the Evangelist
Year of birth missing (living people)
21st-century Anglican Church of Southern Africa bishops
Alumni of St Paul's Theological College in Grahamstown